Yoomiii was a  three-member girl group, with two members from Germany and one from the Netherlands.

History
After success with the documentary soap Das Star-Tagebuch with the German band Banaroo, Super RTL decided to start a second show in year 2006.
Yoomiii was composed to the beginning of the year 2006 for the documentary soap Yoomiii: Das Star-Tagebuch, who sent everyday between April and July on Super RTL.

Members
 Bouchra Nisha Tjon Pon Fong (born 28 April 1983 in Utrecht)
 Kristin Siegel (born 7 October 1986 in Leipzig)
 Nina Alexandra Filipp (born 10 May 1984 in Hamburg)

Discography

Albums

Singles

DVD
2006 Yoomiii der Film

References

External links 
Yoomiii biography, news and discography at Bubblegum Dancer

German pop music groups
German girl groups
Musical groups established in 2006